Smooth Noodle Maps is the eighth studio album by the American new wave band Devo. It was originally released in June 1990 and would be their last album released through Enigma. The album was recorded over a period of three months between October 1989 and January 1990, at Master Control Studios, in Burbank, California. Smooth Noodle Maps was Devo's last full-length studio album until the release of Something for Everybody in 2010, as well as the last Devo studio album to feature David Kendrick on drums. The album includes a cover version of Bonnie Dobson's song "Morning Dew," transformed into a dance song.

"Post Post-Modern Man" hit No. 7 on the Billboard Modern Rock Tracks chart for the week of August 11, 1990 and No. 26 on Billboards Hot Dance/Club Play chart for the week of September 29, 1990.

Artwork and packaging
The front cover of the record (and the fold-out of the CD version) featured the members of the band emerging from a strange circle. The liner notes from the "Post Post-Modern Man" single revealed that the circle is actually a computer simulation of the planet Jupiter. This image of Jupiter was provided by Philip Marcus and Nicholas Socci. Smooth Noodle Maps was also issued on limited edition red vinyl by the Dutch East label. 

The album title Smooth Noodle Maps refers to a kind of discrete mathematical system—a noodle map—which may exhibit chaotic behavior, similar to the standard map. The adjective smooth refers to the lack of kinks or discontinuities. This is referenced in the song "Devo Has Feelings Too", which includes the lyric, "snake through the chaos with a smooth noodle map." 

Promotion
Two music videos were made for the album's second single, "Post Post-Modern Man". The first, which was directed by Devo co-founder and bassist Gerald Casale and was never officially released, saw the band driving a Lincoln Town Car along the desolate Interstate 10 in Southern California. According to Casale, when the finished video was delivered to Enigma, they demanded the video include March 1990's Playboy Playmate of the Month, Deborah Driggs, in order to make it more marketable. After acquiescing to Enigma's demands, MTV then rejected the video because it used the "Macro Post Modern Mix" of the song instead of the "college alternative track" they wanted to market, as featured on the original album. This resulted in a second video directed by Rocky Schenck, which featured Devo in a spoof of the Home Shopping Network, selling various Devo-related merchandise.

Reissue
In 2018, Futurismo Inc. issued a two-disc deluxe edition of Smooth Noodle Maps, on both CD and vinyl formats. The double CD set comes housed in a digipak while the double LP comes in three vinyl color variations. Both formats include gatefold sleeves with die-cut windows and changeable covers, a fold-out poster and liner notes from band member Gerald Casale.

Critical reception

Village Voice critic Robert Christgau awarded the album a "Dud" rating, which meant he did not write a review to accompany it. In retrospective reviews, AllMusic's Steve Huey noted that while the album was "inconsistent, especially in terms of subject matter, the band does try some new ideas in its arrangements." Similarly, Mark Prindle noted that the album "features newer synths and an attempt to incorporate dance elements into Devo's late-period faceless boring dance-pop, but it's just as hookless, generic and dated as its two predecessors."

Track listing

 The "Post Post-Modern Man" mixes contain samples of "It's More Fun to Compute" by Kraftwerk.2019 Futurismo Inc. "Deluxe Edition" bonus discTracks 8–14 previously unreleased.

Personnel
Credits adapted from Pioneers Who Got Scalped: The Anthology CD liner notes:Devo Mark Mothersbaugh – vocals, keyboards, guitar
 Gerald Casale – vocals, bass guitar, keyboards
 Bob Mothersbaugh – lead guitar, vocals
 Bob Casale – rhythm guitar, keyboards, vocals
 David Kendrick – drums

Credits adapted from the original album's liner notes:Additional musician Frank Schubert – guitar (tracks 10–11)Technical'''
 Devo – producer
 Bob Casale – engineer
 Andrew Ballard – assistant engineer
 Jeff Lord Alge – mixing
 Ryan S. Moore – digital programming
 Marty Frazoo – technical assistance
 Björn Almstedt – mastering 
 Pat Dillon – art direction
 Gerald Casale – art direction, graphic concepts
 Laddy Van Jansky – photography

 Tour 
Like the Total Devo tour before it, the Smooth Noodle Maps tour saw Devo scaling things back and presenting a very basic set with no complex visuals. The band wore plain white Tyvek shirts and shorts with the Jupiter image from Smooth Noodle Maps on the left breast of the shirt. As in earlier tours, Devo removed their shirts later in the set to reveal solid black T-shirts emblazoned with the band name on the front. The three songs performed from the album were "When We Do It," "Post Post-Modern Man" and "A Change Is Gonna Cum". Prior to the Smooth Noodle Maps tour, Devo had performed "Post Post-Modern Man" and "A Change Is Gonna Cum" as early as October 1989.

Due to poor ticket sales and the bankruptcy and dissolution of Enigma, who was responsible for organizing and financing the tour, the Smooth Noodle Maps tour had to be cancelled part way through. The final concert of the tour took place at Perkins Palace in Pasadena, California on March 23, 1991. The concert featured a different setlist than other shows on the tour, omitting "Going Under," "Happy Guy," "Post Post-Modern Man," "A Change Is Gonna Cum," "Satisfaction," "Jocko Homo," "Smart Patrol/Mr. DNA", and adding "Here to Go" from 1984's Shout (the only time the song was ever played live), as well as older songs "Blockhead" and "Be Stiff." This gig also marked the last time Devo played "Be Stiff" until the 2009 Freedom of Choice re-release tour as well as the final performances of "When We Do It" and "Somewhere with Devo". The concert saw Devo don a new look, eschewing the aforementioned white Tyvek shirts and shorts and replacing them with multi-colored leisure suits (as seen in the artwork for the album) as well as red pompadours for the encore.

In an interview for their 1996 computer game Adventures of the Smart Patrol, Mark Mothersbaugh stated, "Around '88, '89, '90 maybe, we did our last tour in Europe, and it was kind of at that point, we were watching This Is Spinal Tap'' on the bus and said, 'Oh my God, that's our life.' And we just said, 'Things have to change.' So we kind of agreed from there that we wouldn't do live shows anymore." Devo would not perform again until a reunion gig at the Sundance Film Festival of 1996.

Tour setlist

References

External links

Devo albums
1990 albums
Enigma Records albums